Grover C. "Bill" Gulick  (February 22, 1916 – October 25, 2013 ) was an American writer and historian from Walla Walla, Washington.

Early life
Gulick was born in Kansas City, Missouri. According to his autobiography, his grandmother wanted him to be named after his father, as Grover Cleveland Gulick, Jr.; but his mother resisted fiercely, and they eventually compromised with Grover C. (only) Gulick, "with my Mother saying I could choose my own middle name when I became old enough to do so." He later acquired the nickname 'Bill'.

He graduated from Classen High School in Oklahoma City, Oklahoma in 1934. The following September, he attended the University of Oklahoma.

Career
Gulick had numerous short stories and 20 novels published, of which three have been made into movies. His book Snake River Country won the 1971 Pacific Northwest Booksellers Award as Best Non-fiction Book.

Short stories
 1955 – The Road to Denver, short story published in the Saturday Evening Post
 April 4, 1942 –  The Saga of Mike Shannon, short story published in Liberty Magazine

Books
 1950 – Bend of the Snake, novel
 1952 – A Drum Calls West, novel
 1954 – A Thousand for the Cariboo, novel
 1958 – The Land Beyond, novel
 1958 – Showdown in the Sun, novel
 1961 - Shaming of Broken Horn, novel
 1962 – The Moon-Eyed Appaloosa, novel
 1963 – Hallelujah Trail, novel
 1966 – They Come to a Valley, novel
 1969 – Liveliest Town in the West, novel
 1971 – The Country Club Caper, novel
 1971 – Snake River Country, non-fiction
 1979 – Treasure in Hell's Canyon, novel
 1981 – Chief Joseph Country: Land of the Nez Percé, non-fiction
 1988 – Northwest Destiny: A Trilogy, Distant Trails 1805–1836; Gathering Storm 1837–1868; Lost Wallowa 1869–1879, novel
 1990 – Roadside History of Oregon, non-fiction 
 1996 – A Traveler's History of Washington, non-fiction
 1997 - Roll On, Columbia: To the Pacific : A Historical Novel (To the Pacific/Bill Gulick, Bk 1), historical fiction 

Filmography
 Hallelujah Trail (1965), based on the novel Hallelujah Trail, aka '''John Sturges' The Hallelujah Trail
 Hotel de Paree (1960), 1 episode: "Sundance and the Greenhorn Trader"
 The Road to Denver (1955), based on a Saturday Evening Post story
 Bend of the River (1952), based on the novel Bend of the Snake

References

1916 births
2013 deaths
Writers from Kansas City, Missouri
20th-century American novelists
21st-century American novelists
American male novelists
Classen School of Advanced Studies alumni
People from Walla Walla, Washington
People from Hutchinson, Kansas
University of Oklahoma alumni
20th-century American male writers
21st-century American male writers
Novelists from Missouri
20th-century American non-fiction writers
21st-century American non-fiction writers
American male non-fiction writers
Historians from Washington (state)